Barbados will compete at the 2011 Pan American Games in Guadalajara, Mexico from October 14 to 30, 2011. The Barbados team will consist of 52 athletes in 11 sports.

Medalists

Athletics

Barbados has qualified four athletes.

Men

Women

Badminton

Barbados has qualified two badminton athletes.

Men

Women

Mixed

Boxing

Barbados has qualified two boxers.

Men

Cycling

Barbados has received a wildcard to send one male cyclist.

Road cycling
Men

Field hockey

Barbados has qualified a men's and women's field hockey team.
Each team will be made up of sixteen athletes for a total of thirty-two.

Men

Team

Kelvin Alleyne
Andre Boyce
Barry Clarke
Dave Cox
Aaron Forde
Neil Franklin
Paul Gill
Kris Holder
Randy Jules
Dario Lewis
Rodney Phillips
Paul Reid
Jamar Small
Jabari Walcott
Shonkeel Wharton
Vernon Williams

Elimination stage

Crossover

Seventh place match

Women

Team

Lana Als
Nicole Brathwaite
Takirsha Cambridge
Dionne Clarke
Katrina Downes
Chiaka Drakes
Reyna Farnum
Keisha Jordan
Cher King
Jehan Lashley
Gillian Marville
Telicia Morris
Kimberley Rock
Maria Sealy
Tammisha Small
Charlia Warner

Elimination stage

Crossover

Seventh place match

Squash

Barbados has received a wildcard to send one male squash athlete

Men

Shooting

Barbados has qualified two shooters.

Men

Taekwondo

Barbados have received a wildcard to send one male taekwondo athlete.

Men

Tennis

Barbados has qualified two male tennis players.

Men

Triathlon

Barbados has qualified one male triathlete.

Men

References

Nations at the 2011 Pan American Games
2011
Pan American Games